Artyshchiv –- village (selo) in Lviv Raion, Lviv Oblast (province) of western Ukraine. It belongs to Horodok urban hromada, one of the hromadas of Ukraine. 
Population of the village is around 360 persons. 
Local government – Kernytska village council.

Geography 
Near the village passes highway in Ukraine   connecting Lviv with Przemyśl.

History 
The first record of the village dates back to 1490 year.

During the First World War (in 1916) in the village settled several persons from the village Chystopady Ternopil region.

Until 18 July 2020, Artyshchiv belonged to Horodok Raion. The raion was abolished in July 2020 as part of the administrative reform of Ukraine, which reduced the number of raions of Lviv Oblast to seven. The area of Horodok Raion was merged into Lviv Raion.

Cult constructions and religion 

In the village was registered religious community the Church of the Intercession of the Blessed Mother (Ukrainian Greek-Catholic Church).
There is a new Church of the Holy Virgin. She was consecrated on October 14, 2010.

References

External links 
 village Artyshchiv
 weather.in.ua

Literature 
 History of Towns and Villages of the Ukrainian SSR, Lvov region. – К. : ГРУРЕ, 1968 р. 

Villages in Lviv Raion